Tolsford Hill BT Tower is a telecommunication tower built of reinforced concrete at Tolsford Hill on the North Downs near Folkestone, Kent. Tolsford Hill BT Tower is one of the few British towers built of reinforced concrete and is 67.36 metres ( 221 ft) high.

See also
 British Telecom microwave network
 Telecommunications towers in the United Kingdom

References
 RSG: Features: The Towers of Backbone.

Communication towers in the United Kingdom
Towers in Kent
British Telecom buildings and structures
Transmitter sites in England